Cellana ornata is a species of true limpet, a marine gastropod mollusc in the family Nacellidae, one of the families of true limpets.

Distribution
This marine species occurs off New Zealand.

References

 Powell A. W. B., William Collins Publishers Ltd, Auckland 1979 
 Nakano T. & Ozawa T. (2007). Worldwide phylogeography of limpets of the order Patellogastropoda: molecular, morphological and paleontological evidence. Journal of Molluscan Studies 73(1): 79–99
 Spencer, H.G., Marshall, B.A. & Willan, R.C. (2009). Checklist of New Zealand living Mollusca. Pp 196-219. in: Gordon, D.P. (ed.) New Zealand inventory of biodiversity. Volume one. Kingdom Animalia: Radiata, Lophotrochozoa, Deuterostomia. Canterbury University Press.
 Maxwell, P.A. (2009). Cenozoic Mollusca. Pp 232-254 in Gordon, D.P. (ed.) New Zealand inventory of biodiversity. Volume one. Kingdom Animalia: Radiata, Lophotrochozoa, Deuterostomia. Canterbury University Press, Christchurch.

External links
 Dillwyn, L. W. (1817). A descriptive catalogue of Recent shells, arranged according to the Linnean method; with particular attention to the synonymy. London: John and Arthur Arch. Vol. 1: 1-580; Vol. 2: 581-1092 + index
 Hombron J.B. & Jacquinot C.H. (1841). Description de quelques mollusques provenant de la campagne de l'Astrolabe et de la Zélée. Annales des Sciences Naturelles. ser. 2, Zoologie, 16: 62-65, 190-192
 Gould, A. A. (1846). Descriptions of new shells, collected by the United States Exploring Expedition. Proceedings of the Boston Society of Natural History. 2: 141-145, 148-152
 Reeve, L. A. (1854-1855). Monograph of the genus Patella. In: Conchologia Iconica, or, illustrations of the shells of molluscous animals, vol. 8, pls 1-42 and unpaginated tex. L. Reeve & Co., London.

Nacellidae
Gastropods of New Zealand
Gastropods described in 1817